Tydd (from tide) is part of the name of some communities near the Wash in eastern England.

 Tydd St Giles, a village in north-east Cambridgeshire
 Tydd St Mary, a village in south-east Lincolnshire
 Tydd Gote, a hamlet between the two villages
 Tydd railway station which served the communities until its closure in 1959